The men's 400 metres T12 event at the 2020 Summer Paralympics in Tokyo, took place between 31 August and 2 September 2021.

Records
Prior to the competition, the existing records were as follows:

Results

Heats
Heat 1 took place on 31 August 2021, at 21:17:

Heat 2 took place on 31 August 2021, at 21:25:

Heat 3 took place on 31 August 2021, at 21:33:

Final
The final took place on 2 September 2021, at 9:42:

References

Men's 400 metres T12
2021 in men's athletics